Ellen Becker (born 3 August 1960 in Duisburg) is a German rower.

References

External links
 
 
 

1960 births
Living people
Sportspeople from Duisburg
Rowers at the 1984 Summer Olympics
Olympic bronze medalists for West Germany
Olympic rowers of West Germany
Olympic medalists in rowing
West German female rowers
Medalists at the 1984 Summer Olympics
20th-century German women